Sean Robinson may refer to:
 Sean Robinson (filmmaker) (born 1985), American film director and editor
 Sean Robinson (rugby union, born 1991), English rugby union player 
 Sean Robinson (rugby union, born 1993), South African rugby union player
 Sean Robinson (born 1995), English professional boxer and Boxxer member
 Sean Robinson, English owner of the haunted painting The Anguished Man